"Celebration of the Lizard" is a performance piece by American rock band the Doors, featuring lyrics written by lead singer Jim Morrison and music by the Doors. Composed as a series of poems, the piece includes both spoken verse and sung lyrics, musical sections and passages of allegorical storytelling.

"Celebration of the Lizard" was performed in its entirety at several Doors concerts, with a complete live performance of the piece appearing on the band's 1970 live album Absolutely Live (and, subsequently, on the 1991 live compilation album In Concert). A complete studio-recorded version later appeared on the compilation album Legacy: The Absolute Best in 2003, and as a bonus track on Rhino's 40th Anniversary edition of Waiting for the Sun (2007).

Background

According to Morrison, "Celebration of the Lizard" was "pieced together on different occasions out of already existing elements rather than having any generative core from which it grew." The entire piece was originally intended to be recorded and released as one full side of the band's third studio album, Waiting for the Sun, in 1968. However, record producer Paul A. Rothchild and the members of the band thought that the extended poetic sections and overall length of the piece made a complete recording impossible, while the other reason was due to its lack of commercial appeal. The band did attempt to record the full piece but abandoned the idea, as they were dissatisfied with the results.

The musical passage "Not to Touch the Earth" was recorded separately and released on the Waiting for the Sun album, while the lyrics for the rest of the piece were published inside the gatefold jacket of the original vinyl LP, with the footnote, "Lyrics to a theatre composition by The Doors." Morrison said in an interview with Rolling Stone magazine upon the piece's failure to appear on the album, "I still think there's hope for it."

Sections
According to author Richie Weidman, "Celebration of the Lizard" is divided into seven sections:
 "Lions in the Street"
 "Wake Up!"
 "A Little Game”
 "The Hill Dwellers"
 "Not to Touch the Earth"
 "Names of the Kingdom"
 "The Palace of Exile"

References

External links
 

The Doors songs
Song recordings produced by Paul A. Rothchild
1970 songs
Songs written by Jim Morrison
Songs written by Robby Krieger
Songs written by Ray Manzarek
Songs written by John Densmore